Neme (or Dorro, Karigari, Moi-e ~ Moive) is a Yam language spoken in Western Province, Papua New Guinea.

References

Nambu languages
Languages of Western Province (Papua New Guinea)
Severely endangered languages